Pittsburg, Georgia refers to three places in the state of Georgia in the United States:

Pittsburgh, Georgia (Fulton County)
Pittsburg, Georgia (DeKalb County)
Pittsburg, Georgia (Walker County)